Roz Patterson (nee McGregor), was a fictional character in the Australian police drama series ‘Blue Heelers’. She was a starring character in the series from the beginning; but was the first character to leave the series, staying not even a year. She was portrayed by Western Australian actress, Ann Burbrook.

In the series, she is married to Wayne Patterson, one of the Mount Thomas Police constables. She arrives with him from the city and stays with him in the police residence. Roz is a very friendly and warm person and one who is very loyal to her friends. She may perhaps be a little naive and gullible and may make some mistakes, but she has good intentions and a kind heart. She is the 20th longest-serving character after Tom Croydon, Chris Riley, P.J. Hasham, Maggie Doyle, Ben Stewart, Nick Schultz, Jo Parrish, Evan Jones Adam Cooper, Dash McKinley, Jack Lawson, Susie Raynor, Wayne Patterson, Amy Fox, Kelly O'Rourke, Joss Peroni, Mark Jacobs and Alex Kirby. She is also the 2nd shortest-serving character.

Character Storylines

Season 1 
At the beginning of season 1, Roz is introduced to us as the wife of Wayne Patterson. She was, at that time, cleaning the station as she was the wife of the watch-house keeper. She resented the job (mostly due to the police's unwritten rule that the watch-house keeper's wife was not only expected to clean the station, but also the cells and provide meals for those in the cells, all unpaid) and resented that she was forced to do this job and have little life of her own. She was always a city girl and liked to have friends around her and the comforts of life—not much of this in Mount Thomas, she thought.

After a failed attempt to run a beauty business out of the police residence where she put an ad in the local paper with the station number before Wayne could clear it with Tom Croydon, Roz purchased a car of her own, which she used for her new idea of a mobile beauty business. This was all going fine for her until she was pulled over by Nick, who gave her a ticket for doing 19 km/h over the speed limit. Roz had previously had many traffic infringements and, as a result, her license was suspended putting an end to her driving and the business. Roz was furious at Nick for this, with Roz giving both Wayne and Nick a hard time over it. Wayne tried to reason with Nick with no success. Nick later explained to Roz his reason's for not going easy on her, telling her that his wife and daughter had been killed by a drunk driver who was speeding which prompted him to join the traffic division.

She was then lucky enough to get a job as a clerical assistant at the Mount Thomas police station, and she enjoyed doing this. Working together put strain on Roz and Wayne’s marriage but they made it work. After a while, though, it became too much for Roz to deal with. As part of the job, she had been exposed to all the terrible things that Wayne had to put up with, and was seeing all that Wayne never told her. These things scared her and she began to worry about Wayne more and more. Doing this job, Roz became very attached to some of the people she had to deal with. One particular women caught her eye and she began to feel sorry for this mother, who was trying to support her children, and working at a pub at the same time. When she wanted some information that Roz had access to, Roz felt obligated to get her this information, which could change her life for the better. Roz stole the information from the police computer, and was found out. Roz was dismissed from her job and returned to the boring old life she had before.

The last straw for Roz finally came when, one night, Wayne received a call about a burglary out of town on an old farm. He left to attend but the complainant called back and started talking to Roz, who then heard a shooting over the telephone. She was terrified that Wayne had again been shot. This was too much for her. She decided to move back to the city to her parents' house and end the marriage, much to Wayne's dismay.

Other Appearances 
Roz also appeared in Episode 97 (Unfinished Business) as a guest. This was the episode after Wayne’s final episode and she came to attend the funeral and tie up the loose ends.

See also
 Blue Heelers
 Ann Burbrook

Blue Heelers characters